Otto Bucher  (* 1901; died unknown) was a Swiss rower who competed in the 1928 Summer Olympics and won the silver medal as member of the Swiss team in  coxed four.

References

1901 births
Year of death unknown
Swiss male rowers
Olympic rowers of Switzerland
Rowers at the 1928 Summer Olympics
Olympic silver medalists for Switzerland
Olympic medalists in rowing
Medalists at the 1928 Summer Olympics